Mapleton Park is an urban nature park located in Moncton, New Brunswick, Canada. It is located in the rapidly growing northwest part of the city adjacent to the Trans Canada Highway and measures 1.21 km2 in area.

Places of note
 Mapleton Rotary Lodge
 Skating Pond
 Hiking Trails

See also
 Centennial Park
 Irishtown Nature Park
 Moncton Urban Parks

External links
 Information about the park

Parks in Moncton